Iraq is a country in Western Asia that largely corresponds with the territory of ancient Mesopotamia. The history of Mesopotamia extends from the Lower Paleolithic period until the establishment of the Caliphate in the late 7th century AD, after which the region came to be known as Iraq. Encompassed within Iraqi territory is the ancient land of Sumer, which came into being between 6000 and 5000 BC during the Neolithic Ubaid period of Mesopotamian history, and is widely considered the oldest civilization in recorded history. It is also the historic center of the Akkadian, Neo-Sumerian, Babylonian, Neo-Assyrian, and Neo-Babylonian empires, a succession of local ruling dynasties that reigned over Mesopotamia and various other regions of the Ancient Near East during the Bronze and Iron Ages.

Iraq during antiquity witnessed some of the world's earliest writing, literature, sciences, mathematics, laws and philosophies; hence its common epithet, the Cradle of Civilization.

This era of self-rule lasted until 539 BC, when the Neo-Babylonian Empire was conquered by the neighbouring Achaemenid Empire under Cyrus the Great, who proclaimed himself "King of Babylon". The ancient city of the same name, which had been the titular center of both Babylonian civilizations, became the most important of the four Achaemenid capitals.

Over the next 700 years, the regions forming modern Iraq came under Greek, Parthian, and Roman rule, with the Greeks and Parthians establishing new imperial capitals in the area with the cities of Seleucia and Ctesiphon, respectively. By the 3rd century AD, when the area once again fell under Persian (Sasanian) control, nomadic Arab tribesmen originating from South Arabia (consisting mostly of modern-day Yemen) began to migrate and settle within Lower Mesopotamia, culminating in the creation of the Sassanid-aligned Lakhmid Kingdom in around 300 AD; the Arabic name al-ʿIrāq dates to roughly this time. The Sassanid Empire was eventually conquered by the Rashidun Caliphate in the 7th century, with Iraq specifically falling under Islamic rule following the Battle of al-Qadisiyyah in 636. The city of Kufa was founded shortly thereafter in close proximity to the previous Lakhmid capital of Al-Hirah, and it became the home of the Rashidun dynasty from 656 until their overthrow by the Umayyads in 661. With the rise of the Abbasids in 750, Iraq once again became the center of Caliphate rule—first in Kufa from 750–752, then in Anbar for the following decade, and finally in the city of Baghdad after its founding in 762. Baghdad would remain the capital of the Abbasid Caliphate for the majority of its existence, during which time it became the cultural and intellectual center of the world in what is known today as the Islamic Golden Age. Baghdad's rapid growth and prosperity in the 9th century would be followed by a period of stagnation in the 10th century due to the Buwayhid and Seljuq invasions, but it remained of central importance until the Mongol invasion of 1258. After this, Iraq became a province of the Turco-Mongol Ilkhanate and declined in importance. After the disintegration of the Ilkhanate, Iraq was ruled by the Jalairids and Kara Koyunlu until its eventual absorption into the Ottoman Empire in the 16th century, intermittently falling under Iranian Safavid and Mamluk control.

Ottoman rule ended with World War I, after which the British Empire administered Mandatory Iraq alongside a nominally self-governing Hashemite monarchy headed by King Faisal I. The Kingdom of Iraq was eventually granted full independence in 1932 under the terms of the Anglo-Iraqi Treaty, signed by High Commissioner Francis Humphrys and Iraqi Prime Minister Nuri al-Said two years prior. A republic formed in 1958 following a coup d'état. Saddam Hussein governed from 1968 to 2003, into which period fall the Iran–Iraq War and the Gulf War. Saddam Hussein was deposed following the 2003 invasion of Iraq.

Prehistory 

During 1957–1961 Shanidar Cave was excavated by Ralph Solecki and his team from Columbia University, and nine skeletons of Neanderthal man of varying ages and states of preservation and completeness (labelled Shanidar I–IX) were discovered dating from 60,000–80,000 years BP. A tenth individual was recently discovered by M. Zeder during examination of a faunal assemblage from the site at the Smithsonian Institution. The remains seemed to Zeder to suggest that Neanderthals had funeral ceremonies, burying their dead with flowers (although the flowers are now thought to be a modern contaminant), and that they took care of injured and elderly individuals.

Mesopotamia is the site of the earliest developments of the Neolithic Revolution from around 10,000 BC. It has been identified as having "inspired some of the most important developments in human history including the invention of the wheel, the planting of the first cereal crops and the development of cursive script, Mathematics, Astronomy and Agriculture."

Ancient Mesopotamia

Bronze Age 

Sumer emerged as the civilization of Lower Mesopotamia out of the prehistoric Ubaid period (mid-6th millennium BC) in the Early Bronze Age (Uruk period)
Classical Sumer ends with the rise of the Akkadian Empire in the 24th century BC. Following the Gutian period, the Ur III kingdom was once again able to unite large parts of southern and central Mesopotamia under a single ruler in the 21st century. It may have eventually disintegrated due to Amorite incursions. The Amorite dynasty of Isin persisted until c. 1600 BC, when southern Mesopotamia was united under Kassite Babylonian rule.

The north of Mesopotamia had become the Akkadian-speaking state of Assyria by the late 25th century BC. Along with the rest of Mesopotamia it was ruled

by Akkadian kings from the late 24th to mid 22nd centuries BC, after which it once again became independent.

Babylonia was a state in Lower Mesopotamia with Babylon as its capital. It was founded as an independent state by an Amorite king named Sumuabum in 1894 BC.

Akkadian gradually replaced Sumerian as the spoken language of Mesopotamia somewhere around the turn of the 3rd and the 2nd millennium BC, but Sumerian continued to be used as a written or ceremonial language in Mesopotamia well into the period of classical antiquity.

Babylonia emerged from the Amorite dynasties (c. 1900 BC) when Hammurabi (c. 1792–1750 BC), unified the territories of the former kingdoms of Sumer and Akkad.
During the early centuries of what is called the "Amorite period", the most powerful city-states were Isin and Larsa, although Shamshi-Adad I came close to uniting the more northern regions around Assur and Mari. One of these Amorite dynasties was established in the city-state of Babylon, which would ultimately take over the others and form the first Babylonian empire, during what is also called the Old Babylonian Period.

Assyria was an Akkadian (East Semitic) kingdom in Upper Mesopotamia, that came to rule regional empires a number of times through history. It was named for its original capital, the ancient city of Assur (Akkadian ).

Of the early history of the kingdom of Assyria, little is positively known. In the Assyrian King List, the earliest king recorded was Tudiya. He was a contemporary of Ibrium of Ebla who appears to have lived in the late 25th or early 24th century BC, according to the king list. The foundation of the first true urbanised Assyrian monarchy was traditionally ascribed to Ushpia a contemporary of Ishbi-Erra of Isin and Naplanum of Larsa. c. 2030 BC.

Assyria had a period of empire from the 19th to 18th centuries BC. From the 14th to 11th centuries BC Assyria once more became a major power with the rise of the Middle Assyrian Empire.

Iron Age 

The Neo-Assyrian Empire (911–609 BC) was the dominant political force in the Ancient Near East during the Iron Age, eclipsing Babylonia, Egypt, Urartu and Elam. During this period, Aramaic was also made an official language of the empire, alongside the Akkadian language.

The Neo-Babylonian Empire (626–539 BC) marks the final period of the history of the Ancient Near East preceding Persian conquest. A year after the death of the last strong Assyrian ruler, Assurbanipal, in 627 BC, the Assyrian empire spiralled into a series of brutal civil wars. Babylonia rebelled under Nabopolassar, a member of the Chaldean tribe which had migrated from the Levant to south eastern Babylonia in the early 9th century BC. In alliance with the Medes, Persians, Scythians and Cimmerians, they sacked the city of Nineveh in 612 BC, and the seat of empire was transferred to Babylonia for the first time since the death of Hammurabi in the mid 18th century BC. This period witnessed a general improvement in economic life and agricultural production, and a great flourishing of architectural projects, the arts and science.
The Neo-Babylonian period ended with the reign of Nabonidus in 539 BC. To the east, the Persians had been growing in strength, and eventually Cyrus the Great established his dominion over Babylon.

Classical Antiquity

Achaemenid and Seleucid rule 

Mesopotamia was conquered by the Achaemenid Persians under Cyrus the Great in 539 BC, and remained under Persian rule for two centuries.

The Persian Empire fell to Alexander of Macedon in 331 BC and came under Greek rule as part of the Seleucid Empire. Babylon declined after the founding of Seleucia on the Tigris, the new Seleucid Empire capital. 
The Seleucid Empire at the height of its power stretched from the Aegean in the west to India in the east. It was a major center of Hellenistic culture that maintained the preeminence of Greek customs where a Greek political elite dominated, mostly in the urban areas.  The Greek population of the cities who formed the dominant elite were reinforced by immigration from Greece.
Much of the eastern part of the empire was conquered by the Parthians under Mithridates I of Parthia in the mid-2nd century BC.

Parthian and Roman rule 

At the beginning of the 2nd century AD, the Romans, led by emperor Trajan, invaded Parthia and conquered Mesopotamia, making it an imperial province. It was returned to the Parthians shortly after by Trajan's successor, Hadrian.

Christianity reached Mesopotamia in the 1st century AD, and Roman Syria in particular became the center of Eastern Rite Christianity and the Syriac literary tradition. Mandeism is also believed to have either originated there around this time or entered as Mandaeans sought refuge from Palestine.
Sumerian-Akkadian religious tradition disappeared during this period, as did the last remnants of cuneiform literacy, although temples were still being dedicated to the Assyrian national god Ashur in his home city as late as the 4th century.

Sassanid Empire 

In the 3rd century AD, the Parthians were in turn succeeded by the Sassanid dynasty, which ruled Mesopotamia until the 7th-century Islamic invasion. The Sassanids conquered the independent states of Adiabene, Osroene, Hatra and finally Assur during the 3rd century. In the mid-6th century the Persian Empire under the Sassanid dynasty was divided by Khosrow I into four quarters, of which the western one, called Khvārvarān, included most of modern Iraq, and subdivided to provinces of Mishān, Asuristān (Assyria), Adiabene and Lower Media. The term Iraq is widely used in the medieval Arabic sources for the area in the center and south of the modern republic as a geographic rather than a political term, implying no greater precision of boundaries than the term "Mesopotamia" or, indeed, many of the names of modern states before the 20th century.

There was a substantial influx of Arabs  in the Sassanid period. 
Upper Mesopotamia came to be known as Al-Jazirah in Arabic (meaning "The Island" in reference to the "island" between the Tigris and Euphrates rivers), and Lower Mesopotamia came to be known as ʿIrāq-i ʿArab, meaning "the escarpment of the Arabs" (viz. to the south and east of "the island".

Until 602, the desert frontier of the Persian Empire had been guarded by the Arab Lakhmid kings of Al-Hirah. In that year, Shahanshah Khosrow II  Aparviz (Persian خسرو پرويز) abolished the Lakhmid kingdom and laid the frontier open to nomad incursions. Farther north, the western quarter was bounded by the Byzantine Empire. The frontier more or less followed the modern Syria-Iraq border and continued northward, passing between Nisibis (modern Nusaybin) as the Sassanian frontier fortress and Dara and Amida (modern Diyarbakır) held by the Byzantines.

Middle Ages

Islamic conquest 

The first organized conflict between invading Arab tribes and occupying Persian forces in Mesopotamia seems to have been in 634, when the Arabs were defeated at the Battle of the Bridge. There was a force of some 5,000 Muslims under Abū `Ubayd ath-Thaqafī, which was routed by the Persians. This was followed by Khalid ibn al-Walid's successful campaign which saw all of Iraq come under Arab rule within a year, with the exception of the Persian Empire's capital, Ctesiphon. Around 636, a larger Arab Muslim force under Sa`d ibn Abī Waqqās defeated the main Persian army at the Battle of al-Qādisiyyah and moved on to capture the Persian capital of Ctesiphon. By the end of 638, the Muslims had conquered all of the Western Sassanid provinces (including modern Iraq), and the last Sassanid Emperor, Yazdegerd III, had fled to central and then northern Persia, where he was killed in 651.

The Islamic expansions constituted the largest of the Semitic expansions in history. These new arrivals did not disperse and settle throughout the country; instead they established two new garrison cities, at al-Kūfah, near ancient Babylon, and at Basrah in the south, while the north remained largely Assyrian and Arab Christian in character.

Abbasid Caliphate 

The city of Baghdad was built in the 8th century and became the capital of the Abbasid Caliphate.  Baghdad soon became the primary cultural center of the Muslim world during the centuries of the incipient "Islamic Golden Age" of the 8th to 9th centuries.

In the 9th century, the Abbasid Caliphate entered a period of decline. During the late 9th to early 11th centuries, a period known as the "Iranian Intermezzo", parts of (the modern territory of) Iraq were governed by a number of minor Iranian emirates, including the Tahirids, Saffarids, Samanids, Buyids and Sallarids. Tughril, the founder of the Seljuk Empire, captured Baghdad in 1055. In spite of having lost all governance, the Abbasid caliphs nevertheless maintained a highly ritualized court in Baghdad and remained influential in religious matters, maintaining the orthodoxy of their Sunni sect in opposition to the Ismaili and Shia  sects of Islam.

Mongol invasion 

In the later 11th century, Iraq fell under the rule of the Khwarazmian dynasty. Both Turkic secular rule and Abbasid caliphate came to an end with the   Mongol invasions of the 13th century.
The Mongols under Genghis Khan had conquered Khwarezmia by 1221, but Iraq proper gained a respite due to the death of Genghis Khan in 1227 and the subsequent power struggles.
Möngke Khan from 1251 began a renewed expansion of the Mongol Empire,  and when caliph al-Mustasim refused to submit to the Mongols, Baghdad was besieged and captured by Hulagu Khan in 1258. With the destruction of the Abbasid Caliphate, Hulagu had an open route to Syria and moved against the other Muslim powers in the region.

Turco-Mongol rule 

Iraq now became a province on the southwestern fringes of the Ilkhanate and Baghdad would never regain its former importance.

The Jalayirids were a Mongol Jalayir dynasty which ruled over Iraq and western Persia after the breakup of the Ilkhanate in the 1330s. The Jalayirid sultanate lasted about fifty years, until disrupted by Tamerlane's conquests and the revolts of the "Black Sheep Turks" or Qara Qoyunlu Turkmen. After Tamerlane's death in 1405, there was a brief attempt to re-establish the sultanate in southern Iraq and Khuzistan. The Jalayirids were finally eliminated by Kara Koyunlu in 1432.

Ottoman and Mamluk rule 

During the late 14th and early 15th centuries, the Black Sheep Turkmen ruled the area now known as Iraq. In 1466, the White Sheep Turkmen defeated the Black Sheep and took control. Later, the White Sheep were defeated by the Safavids, who took control over Mesopotamia for some time. In the 16th century, most of the territory of present-day Iraq came under the control of Ottoman Empire as the pashalik of Baghdad. Throughout most of the period of Ottoman rule (1533–1918) the territory of present-day Iraq was a battle zone between the rival regional empires and tribal alliances.
Iraq was divided into three vilayets:
 Mosul Province
 Baghdad Province
 Basra Province

The Safavid dynasty of Iran briefly asserted their hegemony over Iraq in the periods of 1508–1533 and 1622–1638. During the years 1747–1831 Iraq was ruled by the Mamluk officers of Georgian origin who succeeded in obtaining autonomy from the Ottoman Empire, suppressed tribal revolts, curbed the power of the Janissaries, restored order and introduced a program of modernization of economy and military. In 1831, the Ottomans managed to overthrow the Mamluk regime and again imposed their direct control over Iraq.

20th century

British mandate of Mesopotamia 

Ottoman rule over Iraq lasted until World War I, when the Ottomans sided with Germany and the Central Powers. In the Mesopotamian campaign against the Central Powers, British forces invaded the country and suffered a defeat at the hands of the Turkish army during the Siege of Kut (1915–16). However the British finally won in the Mesopotamian Campaign with the capture of Baghdad in March 1917. During the war the British employed the help of a number of Assyrian, Armenian and Arab tribes against the Ottomans, who in turn employed the Kurds as allies. After the war the Ottoman Empire was divided up, and the British Mandate of Mesopotamia was established by League of Nations mandate.

Britain imposed a Hāshimite monarchy on Iraq and defined the territorial limits of Iraq without taking into account the politics of the different ethnic and religious groups in the country, in particular those of the Kurds and the Christian Assyrians to the north. During the British occupation, the Kurds fought for independence, and the British employed Assyrian Levies to help quell these insurrections. Iraq also became an oligarchy government at this time.

Although the monarch Faisal I of Iraq was legitimized and proclaimed King by a plebiscite on 23 August 1921, simultaneously changing the official name of the country from Mesopotamia to Iraq, independence was achieved in 1932, when the British Mandate officially ended.

Independent Kingdom of Iraq 

Establishment of Arab Sunni domination in Iraq was followed by Assyrian, Yazidi and Shi'a unrests, which were all brutally suppressed. In 1936, the first military coup took place in the Kingdom of Iraq, as Bakr Sidqi succeeded in replacing the acting Prime Minister with his associate. Multiple coups followed in a period of political instability, peaking in 1941.

During World War II, Iraqi regime of Regent 'Abd al-Ilah was overthrown in 1941 by the Golden Square officers, headed by Rashid Ali. The short lived pro-Nazi government of Iraq was defeated in May 1941 by the allied forces (with local Assyrian and Kurdish help) in Anglo-Iraqi War. Iraq was later used as a base for allied attacks on Vichy-French held Mandate of Syria and support for the Anglo-Soviet invasion of Iran.

In 1945, Iraq joined the United Nations and became a founding member of the Arab League. At the same time, the Kurdish leader Mustafa Barzani led a rebellion against the central government in Baghdad. After the failure of the uprising, Barzani and his followers fled to the Soviet Union.

In 1948, massive violent protests known as the Al-Wathbah uprising broke out across Baghdad with partial communist support, having demands against the government's treaty with Britain. Protests continued into spring and were interrupted in May when martial law was enforced as Iraq entered the failed 1948 Arab–Israeli War along with other Arab League members.

In February 1958, King Hussein of Jordan and `Abd al-Ilāh proposed a union of Hāshimite monarchies to counter the recently formed Egyptian-Syrian union. The prime minister Nuri as-Said wanted Kuwait to be part of the proposed Arab-Hāshimite Union. Shaykh `Abd-Allāh as-Salīm, the ruler of Kuwait, was invited to Baghdad to discuss Kuwait's future. This policy brought the government of Iraq into direct conflict with Britain, which did not want to grant independence to Kuwait. At that point, the monarchy found itself completely isolated. Nuri as-Said was able to contain the rising discontent only by resorting to even greater political oppression.

Republic of Iraq 

Inspired by Gamal Abdel Nasser of Egypt, officers from the Nineteenth Brigade, 3rd Division known as "The Four Colonials", under the leadership of Brigadier Abd al-Karīm Qāsim (known as "az-Za`īm", 'the leader') and Colonel Abdul Salam Arif overthrew the Hashemite monarchy on July 14, 1958. The new government proclaimed Iraq to be a republic and rejected the idea of a union with Jordan. Iraq's activity in the Baghdad Pact ceased.

Abd al-Karim Qasim promoted a civic nationalism in Iraq which asserts the belief that Iraqis are a nation and promotes the cultural unity of Iraqis of different ethnoreligious groups such as Mesopotamian Arabs, Kurds, Turkmens, Assyrians, Chaldeans, Yazidis, Mandeans, Yarsans, and others.

Qasim's vision of nationalism involved the recognition of an Iraqi identity stemming from ancient Mesopotamia including its civilizations of Sumer, Akkad, Babylonia and Assyria.

In 1961, Kuwait gained independence from Britain and Iraq claimed sovereignty over Kuwait. A period of considerable instability followed.

The same year, Mustafa Barzani, who had been invited to return to Iraq by Qasim three years earlier, began engaging Iraqi government forces and establishing Kurdish control in the north in what was the beginning of the First Kurdish Iraqi War.

Ba'athist Iraq

Qāsim was assassinated in February 1963, when the Ba'ath Party took power under the leadership of General Ahmed Hassan al-Bakr (prime minister) and Colonel Abdul Salam Arif (president). In June 1963, Syria, which by then had also fallen under Ba'athist rule, took part in the Iraqi military campaign against the Kurds by providing aircraft, armoured vehicles and a force of 6,000 soldiers. Several months later, `Abd as-Salam Muhammad `Arif led a successful coup against the Ba'ath government. Arif declared a ceasefire in February 1964 which provoked a split among Kurdish urban radicals on one hand and Peshmerga (Freedom fighters) forces led by Barzani on the other.

On April 13, 1966, President Abdul Salam Arif died in a helicopter crash and was succeeded by his brother, General Abdul Rahman Arif. Following this unexpected death, the Iraqi government launched a last-ditch effort to defeat the Kurds. This campaign failed in May 1966, when Barzani forces thoroughly defeated the Iraqi Army at the Battle of Mount Handrin, near Rawanduz. Following the Six-Day War of 1967, the Ba'ath Party felt strong enough to retake power in 1968. Ahmed Hassan al-Bakr became president and chairman of the Revolutionary Command Council (RCC). The Ba'ath government started a campaign to end the Kurdish insurrection, which stalled in 1969. This can be partly attributed to the internal power struggle in Baghdad and also tensions with Iran. Moreover, the Soviet Union pressured the Iraqis to come to terms with Barzani. The war ended with more than 100,000 mortal casualties, with little achievements to both Kurdish rebels and the Iraqi government.

In the aftermath of the First Kurdish Iraqi War, a peace plan was announced in March 1970 and provided for broader Kurdish autonomy. The plan also gave Kurds representation in government bodies, to be implemented in four years. Despite this, the Iraqi government embarked on an Arabization program in the oil rich regions of Kirkuk and Khanaqin in the same period. In the following years, Baghdad government overcame its internal divisions and concluded a treaty of friendship with the Soviet Union in April 1972 and ended its isolation within the Arab world. On the other hand, Kurds remained dependent on the Iranian military support and could do little to strengthen their forces. By 1974 the situation in the north escalated again into the Second Kurdish Iraqi War, to last until 1975.

Under Saddam Hussein

In July 1979, President Ahmed Hassan al-Bakr was forced to resign by Saddam Hussein, who assumed the offices of both President and Chairman of the Revolutionary Command Council. Saddam then purged his opponents including those from within the Baath party.

Iraq's Territorial Claims to Neighboring Countries
 	
Iraq's territorial claims to neighboring countries were largely due to the plans and promises of the Entente countries in 1919–1920, when the Ottoman Empire was divided, to create a more extensive Arab state in Iraq and Jazeera, which would also include significant territories of eastern Syria, southeastern Turkey, all of Kuwait and Iran’s border areas, which are shown on this English map of 1920.

Territorial disputes with Iran led to an inconclusive and costly eight-year war, the Iran–Iraq War (1980–1988, termed Qādisiyyat-Saddām – 'Saddam's Qādisiyyah'), which devastated the economy. Iraq falsely declared victory in 1988 but actually only achieved a weary return to the status quo ante bellum, meaning both sides retained their original borders.

The war began when Iraq invaded Iran, launching a simultaneous invasion by air and land into Iranian territory on 22 September 1980, following a long history of border disputes, and fears of Shia insurgency among Iraq's long-suppressed Shia majority influenced by the Iranian Revolution. Iraq was also aiming to replace Iran as the dominant Persian Gulf state. The United States supported Saddam Hussein in the war against Iran. Although Iraq hoped to take advantage of the revolutionary chaos in Iran and attacked without formal warning, they made only limited progress into Iran and within several months were repelled by the Iranians who regained virtually all lost territory by June 1982. For the next six years, Iran was on the offensive. Despite calls for a ceasefire by the United Nations Security Council, hostilities continued until 20 August 1988. The war finally ended with a United Nations-brokered ceasefire in the form of United Nations Security Council Resolution 598, which was accepted by both sides. It took several weeks for the Iranian armed forces to evacuate Iraqi territory to honor pre-war international borders between the two nations (see 1975 Algiers Agreement). The last prisoners of war were exchanged in 2003.

The war came at a great cost in lives and economic damage—half a million Iraqi and Iranian soldiers, as well as civilians, are believed to have died in the war with many more injured—but it brought neither reparations nor change in borders. The conflict is often compared to World War I, in that the tactics used closely mirrored those of that conflict, including large scale trench warfare, manned machine-gun posts, bayonet charges, use of barbed wire across trenches, human wave attacks across no-man's land, and extensive use of chemical weapons such as mustard gas by the Iraqi government against Iranian troops and civilians as well as Iraqi Kurds. At the time, the UN Security Council issued statements that "chemical weapons had been used in the war." However, in these UN statements, it was never made clear that it was only Iraq that was using chemical weapons, so it has been said that "the international community remained silent as Iraq used weapons of mass destruction against Iranian as well as Iraqi Kurds" and it is believed.

A long-standing territorial dispute was the ostensible reason for Iraq's invasion of Kuwait in 1990. In November 1990, the UN Security Council adopted Resolution 678, permitting member states to use all necessary means, authorizing military action against the Iraqi forces occupying Kuwait and demanded a complete withdrawal by January 15, 1991. When Saddam Hussein failed to comply with this demand, the Gulf War (Operation "Desert Storm") ensued on January 17, 1991. Estimates range from 1,500 to as many as 30,000 Iraqi soldiers killed, as well as less than a thousand civilians.

In March 1991 revolts in the Shia-dominated southern Iraq started involving demoralized Iraqi Army troops and the anti-government Shia parties. Another wave of insurgency broke out shortly afterwards in the Kurdish populated northern Iraq (see 1991 Iraqi uprisings). Although they presented a serious threat to the Iraqi Ba'ath Party regime, Saddam Hussein managed to suppress the rebellions with massive and indiscriminate force and maintained power. They were ruthlessly crushed by the loyalist forces spearheaded by the Iraqi Republican Guard and the population was successfully terrorized. During the few weeks of unrest tens of thousands of people were killed. Many more died during the following months, while nearly two million Iraqis fled for their lives. In the aftermath, the government intensified the forced relocating of Marsh Arabs and the draining of the Iraqi marshlands, while the Coalition established the Iraqi no-fly zones.

On 6 August 1990, after the Iraqi invasion of Kuwait, the U.N. Security Council adopted Resolution 661 which imposed economic sanctions on Iraq, providing for a full trade embargo, excluding medical supplies, food and other items of humanitarian necessity, these to be determined by the Security Council sanctions committee. After the end of the Gulf War and after the Iraqi withdrawal from Kuwait, the sanctions were linked to removal of weapons of mass destruction by Resolution 687. To varying degrees, the effects of government policy, the aftermath of Gulf War and the sanctions regime have been blamed for these conditions.

The effects of the sanctions on the civilian population of Iraq have been disputed. Whereas it was widely believed that the sanctions caused a major rise in child mortality, recent research has shown that commonly cited data were fabricated by the Iraqi government and that "there was no major rise in child mortality in Iraq after 1990 and during the period of the sanctions." An oil for food program was established in 1996 to ease the effects of sanctions.

Iraqi cooperation with UN weapons inspection teams was questioned on several occasions during the 1990s. UNSCOM chief weapons inspector Richard Butler withdrew his team from Iraq in November 1998 because of Iraq's lack of cooperation. The team returned in December. Butler prepared a report for the UN Security Council afterwards in which he expressed dissatisfaction with the level of compliance . The same month, US President Bill Clinton authorized air strikes on government targets and military facilities. Air strikes against military facilities and alleged WMD sites continued into 2002.

U.S. invasion and the aftermath (2003–present)

2003 U.S. invasion 

After the terrorist attacks on New York and Washington in the United States in 2001 were linked to the group formed by the multi-millionaire Saudi Osama bin Laden, American foreign policy began to call for the removal of the Ba'ath government in Iraq. Neoconservative think-tanks in Washington had for years been urging regime change in Baghdad. On August 14, 1998, President Clinton signed Public Law 105–235, which declared that ‘‘the Government of Iraq is in material and unacceptable breach of its international obligations.’’ It urged the President ‘‘to take appropriate action, in accordance with the Constitution and relevant laws of the United States, to bring Iraq into compliance with its international obligations.’’ Several months later, Congress enacted the Iraq Liberation Act of 1998 on October 31, 1998. This law stated that it "should be the policy of the United States to support efforts to remove the regime headed by Saddam Hussein from power in Iraq and to promote the emergence of a democratic government to replace that regime." It was passed 360 - 38 by the United States House of Representatives and 99–0 by the United States Senate in 1998.

The US urged the United Nations to take military action against Iraq. American president George W. Bush stated that Saddām had repeatedly violated 16 UN Security Council resolutions. The Iraqi government rejected Bush's assertions. A team of U.N. inspectors, led by Swedish diplomat Hans Blix was admitted, into the country; their final report stated that Iraqis capability in producing "weapons of mass destruction" was not significantly different from 1992 when the country dismantled the bulk of their remaining arsenals under terms of the ceasefire agreement with U.N. forces, but did not completely rule out the possibility that Saddam still had weapons of mass destruction. The United States and the United Kingdom charged that Iraq was hiding WMD and opposed the team's requests for more time to further investigate the matter. Resolution 1441 was passed unanimously by the UN Security Council on November 8, 2002, offering Iraq "a final opportunity to comply with its disarmament obligations" that had been set out in several previous UN resolutions, threatening "serious consequences" if the obligations were not fulfilled. The UN Security Council did not issue a resolution authorizing the use of force against Iraq.

In March 2003, the United States and the United Kingdom, with military aid from other nations, invaded Iraq.

Over the following years in the U.S. occupation of Iraq, Iraq disintegrated into a civil war from 2006 to 2008, and the situation deteriorated in 2011 which later escalated into a renewed war following ISIL gains in the country in 2014. By 2015, Iraq was effectively divided, the central and southern part being controlled by the government, the northwest by the Kurdistan Regional Government and the western part by the Islamic State. IS was expelled from Iraq in 2017, but a low-intensity ISIL insurgency continues mostly in the rural parts of northern western parts of the country, due to Iraq's long border with Syria.

Occupation (2003–11) 

In 2003, after the American and British invasion, Iraq was occupied by U.S.-led Coalition forces. On May 23, 2003, the UN Security Council unanimously approved a resolution lifting all economic sanctions against Iraq. As the country struggled to rebuild after three wars and a decade of sanctions, it was plagued by violence between a growing Iraqi insurgency and occupation forces. Saddam Hussein, who vanished in April, was captured on December 13, 2003 in ad-Dawr, Saladin Governorate.

Jay Garner was appointed Interim Civil Administrator with three deputies, including Tim Cross. Garner was replaced in May 2003 by Paul Bremer, who was himself replaced by John Negroponte on April 19, 2004. Negroponte was the last US interim administrator and left Iraq in 2005. A parliamentary election was held in January 2005, followed by the drafting and ratification of a constitution and a further parliamentary election in December 2005.

Terrorism emerged as a threat to Iraq's people not long after the invasion of 2003. Al Qaeda now had a presence in the country, in the form of several terrorist groups formerly led by Abu Musab Al Zarqawi. Al Zarqawi was a Jordanian militant Islamist who ran a militant training camp in Afghanistan. He became known after going to Iraq and being responsible for a series of bombings, beheadings and attacks during the Iraq war. Al Zarqawi was killed on June 7, 2006. Many foreign fighters and former Ba'ath Party officials also joined the insurgency, which was mainly aimed at attacking American forces and Iraqis who worked with them. The most dangerous insurgent area was the Sunni Triangle, a mostly Sunni-Muslim area just north of Baghdad.

Reported acts of violence conducted by an uneasy tapestry of insurgents steadily increased by the end of 2006. Sunni jihadist forces including Al Qaeda in Iraq continued to target Shia civilians, notably in the 23 February 2006 attack on the Al Askari Mosque in Samarra, one of Shi'ite Islam's holiest sites leading to a civil war between Sunni and Shia militants in Iraq. Analysis of the attack suggested that the Mujahideen Shura Council and Al-Qaeda in Iraq were responsible, and that the motivation was to provoke further violence by outraging the Shia population. In mid-October 2006, a statement was released stating that the Mujahideen Shura Council had been disbanded and was replaced by the "Islamic State of Iraq". It was formed to resist efforts by the U.S. and Iraqi authorities to win over Sunni supporters of the insurgency. Shia militias, some of whom were associated with elements in the Iraq government, reacted with reprisal acts against the Sunni minority. A cycle of violence thus ensued whereby Sunni insurgent attacks were followed reprisals by Shiite militias, often in the form of Shi'ite death squads that sought out and killed Sunnis. Following a surge in U.S. troops in 2007 and 2008, violence in Iraq began to decrease. The U.S. ended their main military presence in 2011, however, resulting in renewed escalation into war.

Insurgency and war (2011–2017) 

The departure of US troops from Iraq in 2011 triggered a renewed insurgency and by a spillover of the Syrian civil war into Iraq. By 2013, the insurgency escalated into a state renewed war, the central government of Iraq being opposed by various factions, primarily radical Sunni forces.

The Islamic State of Iraq and the Levant   invaded Iraq in 2013–14 and seized the majority of Al Anbar Governorate, including the cities of Fallujah, Al Qaim, Abu Ghraib and (in May 2015) Ramadi, leaving them in control of 90% of Anbar. Tikrit, Mosul and most of the Nineveh province, along with parts of Salahuddin, Kirkuk and Diyala provinces, were seized by insurgent forces in the June 2014 offensive. ISIL also captured Sinjar and a number of other towns in the August 2014 offensive, but were halted by the Sinjar offensive launched in December 2014 by Kurdish Peshmerga and YPG forces. The war ended with a government victory in December 2017.

On 30 April 2016, thousands of protesters entered the Green Zone in Baghdad and occupied the Iraqi parliament building. This happened after the Iraqi parliament did not approve new government ministers. The protesters included supporters of Shia cleric Muqtada Al Sadr. Although Iraqi security forces were present, they did not attempt to stop the protesters from entering the parliament building.

Continued ISIL insurgency and protests (2017–present) 

By 2018, violence in Iraq was at its lowest level in ten years.

Protests over deteriorating economic conditions and state corruption started in July 2018 in Baghdad and other major Iraqi cities, mainly in the central and southern provinces. The latest nationwide protests, erupting in October 2019, had a death toll of at least 93 people, including police.

In November 2021, Iraqi Prime Minister Mustafa al-Kadhimi survived a failed assassination attempt.

Cleric Muqtada al-Sadr's Sadrist Movement was the biggest winner in the 2021 parliamentary elections. Governmental stalemate lead to the 2022 Iraqi political crisis.

In October 2022, Abdul Latif Rashid was elected as the new President of Iraq after winning the parliamentary election against incumbent Barham Salih, who was running for a second term. The presidency is largely ceremonial and is traditionally held by a Kurd.  On 27 October 2022, Mohammed Shia al-Sudani, close ally of former Prime Minister Nouri al-Maliki, took the office to succeed  Mustafa al-Kadhimi as new Prime Minister of Iraq.

See also 

 Abbasid Caliphate
 Akkadian Empire
 Assyria
 Babylonia
 History of Asia
 History of Baghdad
 History of the Middle East
 List of kings of Iraq
 List of presidents of Iraq
 List of prime ministers of Iraq
 Mesopotamia
 Politics of Iraq
 Sumer
 Timeline of Baghdad
 Timeline of Basra

References

Sources

Further reading 
 Broich, John. Blood, Oil and the Axis: The Allied Resistance Against a Fascist State in Iraq and the Levant, 1941 (Abrams, 2019).
 de Gaury, Gerald. Three Kings in Baghdad: The Tragedy of Iraq's Monarchy, (IB Taurus, 2008). 
 Elliot, Matthew. Independent Iraq: British Influence from 1941 to 1958 (IB Tauris, 1996).
 Fattah, Hala Mundhir, and Frank Caso. A brief history of Iraq (Infobase Publishing, 2009).
 Franzén, Johan. “Development vs. Reform: Attempts at Modernisation during the Twilight of British Influence in Iraq, 1946–1958,” Journal of Imperial and Commonwealth History 37#1 (2009), pp. 77–98
 Kriwaczek, Paul. Babylon: Mesopotamia and the Birth of Civilization. Atlantic Books (2010). 
 Murray, Williamson, and Kevin M. Woods. The Iran-Iraq War: A military and strategic history (Cambridge UP, 2014).
 Roux, Georges. Ancient Iraq. Penguin Books (1992). 
 Silverfarb, Daniel. Britain's informal empire in the Middle East: a case study of Iraq, 1929-1941 ( Oxford University Press, 1986).
 Silverfarb, Daniel. The twilight of British ascendancy in the Middle East: a case study of Iraq, 1941-1950 (1994)
 Silverfarb, Daniel. "The revision of Iraq's oil concession, 1949–52." Middle Eastern Studies 32.1 (1996): 69-95.
 Simons, Geoff. Iraq: From Sumer to Saddam (Springer, 2016).
 Tarbush, Mohammad A. The role of the military in politics: A case study of Iraq to 1941 (Routledge, 2015).

Historiography

External links 
Iraq: The Cradle of Civilization
Iraq History and Culture from the cradle of civilization and Noah to the present age and time
Historical Context of the Iran – Iraq War from the Dean Peter Krogh Foreign Affairs Digital Archives

 
Iraq